Virner is an unincorporated community in El Dorado County, California. It is located near Balderson Station.

A post office operated at Virner from 1897 to 1913. The name was due to the nearby Camp Virner, a vacation resort.

References

Unincorporated communities in California
Unincorporated communities in El Dorado County, California